Ernest C. Warde (10 August 1874 – 9 September 1923) was an English actor and director who worked in American silent film. He contributed to more than forty films from 1914 to 1923. He was the son of stage actor Frederick Warde.

Selected filmography
The White Rose (1914)
A Newspaper Nemesis (1915)
The Undertow (1915)
The Skinflint (1915)
 Silas Marner (1916)
The Man Without a Country (1917)
 War and the Woman (1917)
 Her Beloved Enemy (1917)
The Woman in White (1917)
 The Vicar of Wakefield (1917)
Ruler of the Road (1918)
 Prisoners of the Pines (1918)
 One Dollar Bid (1918)
 A Burglar for a Night (1918)
 Three X Gordon (1918)
The Bells (1918)
The Midnight Stage (1919)
The Master Man (1919)
The False Code (1919)
 The Lord Loves the Irish (1919)
 A White Man's Chance (1919)
 The Joyous Liar (1919)
 The House of Whispers (1920)
 Live Sparks (1920)
 $30,000 (1920)
 The Dream Cheater (1920)
 The Devil to Pay (1920)
 The Green Flame (1920)
 The Coast of Opportunity (1920)
 Number 99 (1920)
 Trail of the Axe (1922)

References

External links 

1874 births
1923 deaths
British male film actors
British film directors